Gazania thermalis is a species of flowering plant in the family Asteraceae.  It is found only in Namibia. Its natural habitat is geothermal wetlands. It is threatened by habitat loss.

References

thermalis
Endemic flora of Namibia
Critically endangered plants
Taxonomy articles created by Polbot
Taxa named by Kurt Dinter